Green Township is an inactive township in Hickory County, in the U.S. state of Missouri.

Green Township was established in 1845, and most likely was named after Nathanael Greene (1742–1786), American Revolutionary War general.

References

Townships in Missouri
Townships in Hickory County, Missouri